St. Paul's Cathedral is an historic church building located in Oklahoma City, Oklahoma, United States. It is the seat of the Episcopal Diocese of Oklahoma and it has been listed on the National Register of Historic Places since 1977. In 2020, it reported 881 members, 284 average attendance, and $967,260 in plate and pledge financial support.

History
St. Paul's began as a mission in 1891.  The congregation met in several locations including the federal courthouse.  The first frame building for the congregation was built in 1893 and the mission was raised to parish status on May 14, 1902.  The cornerstone for the present church was laid in 1903 and the first service in the building was held on March 13, 1904. The parish house was opened the same year.  The Diocese of Oklahoma elected in January 1909 to make St. Paul's its Cathedral.  The educational building was built in 1949.

St. Paul's Cathedral was extensively damaged when a bomb exploded at the nearby Alfred P. Murrah Federal Building on April 19, 1995. The Celtic Cross on top of the church was shattered. The roof was lifted and the walls were splayed outward. The cathedral was closed for two years while it was rebuilt. Additional property was purchased and a new facility to house offices and the parish's outreach programs was built. The total price for the renovations and expansion totaled $7.5 million.

Architecture
Arthur J. Williams designed the church in the Norman Gothic style. The exterior features a Norman style tower. The interior has two Tiffany windows behind the altar. Stained glass windows on the Gospel side of the Church depict the Evangels: St. John, St. Paul and St. Luke. The windows on the Epistle side depict events from the life of Christ including the Nativity, Crucifixion and Resurrection. The altar, pulpit and the baptismal font are carved from Carrara marble.

See also

List of the Episcopal cathedrals of the United States
List of cathedrals in the United States

References

External links
St. Paul’s Cathedral Website

Churches in Oklahoma City
Episcopal churches in Oklahoma
Paul, Oklahoma City
Churches completed in 1904
20th-century Episcopal church buildings
Churches on the National Register of Historic Places in Oklahoma
Religious organizations established in 1891
1891 establishments in Oklahoma Territory
Gothic Revival church buildings in Oklahoma
National Register of Historic Places in Oklahoma City